Habaswein is a town in Kenya's Wajir County, which is inhabited by Somalis. The Town, which is loved by many, is often referred to as "The Land Of Milk and Honey"
 According to the 2019 census, the town was the second most populous in the county of Wajir with a population of 21,890. The A13 highway from Isiolo to Mandera passes through Habaswein; it is located on the stretch from Modogashe to Wajir.

References

Populated places in Wajir County